Housejoy is an Indian, Bengaluru-headquartered company that markets home construction, renovation, interior design, painting, maintenance, at-home beauty & salon services known as Zalon, packers & movers, home delivery of essential items known as Housejoymart, fumigation & sanitization service for homes and offices to mobile health checkup camps for general health & COVID testing known as Housejoycare. With in-house teams for all the above mentioned services, currently they serve across 6 cities in India where they have offices as well, which includes Bengaluru (Head office), Chennai, Delhi-NCR, Hyderabad, Mumbai and Pune. They are also planning to expand the above mentioned services and the offices across 24 more cities in India. Their fumigation & sanitization service is currently present across 30 cities in India.

History 
From its inception, Housejoy was facing competition from Indian brands namely UrbanCompany (formerly UrbanClap) & QuikrEasy (formerly QuikrServices), these brands made profit by collecting a small percentage of commission from the amount paid to the service providers for the service they provide to customers through these brands. Housejoy pursued a strategy of rapid growth through acquisition of the brands that focused on the segments within its market niche, and also by expanding to new cities in India. By 2016, Housejoy had expanded to 12 cities in India.

In 2015, an article in Tech in Asia said that although the brand had been growing at a fast pace, it had difficulty in ensuring quality of services because of the highly unorganized services sector in India, wherein training of service providers had not been standardized. The brand also faced some problems in its onboarding process of not vetting service providers, which it was sending to customer's homes.

Restructuring 
In May 2016, Housejoy's board of directors halted the brand's growth due to year-on-year loss, pushing out founders Kumar and Goel, cutting staff, reducing the number of cities served in India to 6, and said it will start focusing on its at-home beauty and salon services, which was its most profitable segment. Around the same time, Housejoy hired Saran Chatterjee, former vice president of Flipkart, as their new CEO.

In 2017, Housejoy launched packers and movers under their home services offering, across Bengaluru, Chennai, Delhi-NCR, Hyderabad and Mumbai.

In 2018, Housejoy launched Home Construction, Renovation, Interior Design and Painting businesses across Bengaluru, Chennai and Hyderabad which could help them to scale up revenue by $15 billion per year.

In February 2020, CEO Saran Chatterjee moved to a non-operating role and Sanchit Gaurav, formerly COO Housejoy, was appointed as the new CEO of Housejoy after which Housejoy launched on-demand home delivery service called "Housejoymart" for the home delivery of essential items to customers doorstep in Bengaluru. During COVID-19, Housejoy saw huge demand for sanitisation & fumigation service by homes and offices and started serving as many as 30 cities in India for the same. Housejoy partnered with 5 major firms during COVID-19 including government of Karnataka, Portea, SRL Diagnostics to set up COVID Testing Camps across Bengaluru. Housejoy also made many new appointments in their leadership team in 2020 as they are planning to expand.

Currently, Housejoy has more than 100 projects in execution for their home construction and renovation businesses across Bengaluru, Chennai and Hyderabad.

Funding & Capitalisation 
Housejoy received $4 million in Series A funding from Matrix Partners in June 2015. It then received another $23 million in Series B funding from Amazon, along with Matrix Partners, Qualcomm Ventures, ruNet, being the other participants in 2015.

References

Further reading
 
 Now I have a better work-life balance, says CEO of Housejoy Sanchit Gaurav on COVID-19 lockdown

Companies based in Bangalore
Indian companies established in 2014
Online companies of India
2014 establishments in Karnataka